Bohyeonsan or Bohyeon Mountain or Mount Bohyeon is located in the province of Gyeongsangbuk-do, eastern South Korea.

The Bohyeon Mountain Starlight Festival takes place in summer and is centered in the Bohyunsan Optical Astronomy Observatory, which was established in 1996.  

This observatory houses the third-largest telescope in Korea, which is the country's largest optical instrument. This 1.8-meter reflecting telescope was built near the peak. There is also a Bohyeon Mountain Science Museum, situated just below the observatory, run by the Yeongcheon City Government.

See also
List of mountains of Korea
Bohyeonsa, temple in Yeongcheon

References

Yeongcheon
Mountains of North Gyeongsang Province
Cheongsong County
Pohang
Mountains of South Korea
One-thousanders of South Korea
Taebaek Mountains